What I Learned About Ego, Opinion, Art & Commerce is a compilation album by American rock band Goo Goo Dolls. It was released in 2001 by Warner Bros. Records and is a compilation of Goo Goo Dolls songs released from 1987–2000.

Tracks 1–4 are from the album Dizzy Up the Girl. Tracks 5–9 are from the album A Boy Named Goo. Tracks 10–16 are from the album Superstar Car Wash. Tracks 17–20 are from the album Hold Me Up. Track 21 is from the album Jed. Track 22 is from the album Goo Goo Dolls. Multiple songs, such as "Acoustic #3" and "All Eyes On Me", have an extended musical interlude. "Two Days In February" was re-recorded by Rzeznik, a studio version of the original, which was recorded outside. "Naked" is an extended version of the original, which was on A Boy Named Goo, and is similar to the version released as a single. All songs are remixed and remastered.

The album is not a typical best-of compilation, as most of the band's biggest hits (such as "Iris" and "Name") are absent. Instead, the selection is a combination of non-singles and songs that were released as singles prior to the Goo Goo Dolls' 1995 breakout, as well as fan favorites and a few of their less successful singles.

Track listing

References

Goo Goo Dolls compilation albums
2001 greatest hits albums
Warner Records compilation albums